Class Q: Science is a classification used by the Library of Congress Classification system. This article outlines the subclasses of Class Q.

Q - Science (General) 

1-390.......Science (General)
1-295......General
300-390....Cybernetics
350-390...Information theory

QA - Mathematics 

1-939..............Mathematics
1-43..............General
47-59.............Tables
71-90.............Instruments and machines
75-76.95.........Calculating machines
75.5-76.95......Electronic computers. Computer science
76.73.A-Z......Individual languages A-Z
76.73.A12.....ABAP
76.73.A24.....ALGOL
76.73.A27.....APL
76.73.A35.....Ada
76.73.A67.....AppleScript
76.73.A8.......Assembly languages. Assemblers
76.73.A84.....AutoLISP
76.73.A95.....AWK
76.73.B155...B
76.73.B3......BASIC
76.73.B78....BSV 753
76.73.C15.....C
76.73.C153....C++
76.73.C154....C#
76.73.C25.....COBOL
76.73.C56.....Clipper
76.73.C58.....CoffeeScript
76.73.C75.....CSP
76.73.C87.....Curl
76.73.D138...D
76.73.D14.....D*
76.73.D23.....Dart
76.73.D25.....DRL
76.73.D95.....Dylan
76.73.E27.....EasyLanguage
76.73.E38.....ELAN
76.73.E75.....ERLANG
76.73.F16.....F
76.73.F23.....FOCUS
76.73.F25.....FORTRAN
76.73.F74.....FRED
76.73.G25....GW-BASIC
76.73.G63....Go
76.73.H37.....Haskell
76.73.H6.......HP-GL/2
76.73.H96.....HyperTalk
76.73.I22.......INFORMIX-4GL
76.73.J2........J#
76.73.J38.....Java
76.73.J39.....JavaScript
76.73.J63.....Job Control Language
76.73.J7.......JR
76.73.K63.....Kodu
76.73.K67.....KornShell
76.73.L23......LISP
76.73.L62......LogiQL
76.73.L63......LOGO
76.73.L66.......LotusScript
76.73.L82.......Lua
76.73.M15......M
76.73.M29......Mathematica
76.73.M35......Maude
76.73.M39......MDX
76.73.M53.....Microsoft Visual Basic
76.73.M6.......ML
MySQL see QA76.73.S67
76.73.N39.....NCL
76.73.O115...Objective-C
76.73.O213...OpenCL
76.73.P224....PHP
76.73.P25.....PL/1
76.73.P32......packetC
76.73.P67.....PostScript
PowerShell see QA76.73.W56
76.73.P75.....Processing
76.73.P76.....Prolog
76.73.P98.....Python
76.73.R25.....RPG
76.73.R3......R
76.73.R33....Racket
76.73.R83....Ruby
76.73.R87....Rust
76.73.S15.....S
76.73.S27.....SAS
76.73.S28.....Scala
76.73.S34.....Scheme
76.73.S345...Scratch
76.73.S35.....SDL
76.73.S59.....SPARK
76.73.S62.....SPARQL
76.73.S67.....SQL. MySQL
76.73.S95.....Swift
76.73.T44......Tcl
76.73.T97......TypeScript
76.73.U63......UPC
76.73.V27......VBScript
Visual Basic see QA76.73.M53
76.73.W56.....Windows PowerShell
76.73.W65.....Wolfram language
76.73.X16......X86 assembly language
76.73.X57......XPath
76.73.X58......XSLT
76.73.Z2.........Z

76.75-76.765...Computer software
76.75...........Periodicals. Societies. Serials
76.751........Congresses
76.752........Dictionaries
76.753........Catalogs
76.754........General works
76.755........Handbooks, tables, etc.
76.756........Addresses, essays, lectures
76.758........Software engineering
76.76.A-Z.....Special topics, A-Z 
76.76.A54....AngularJS
76.76.A63....Application program interfaces
76.76.A65....Application software
76.76.A87....Assemblers
76.76.A98....Automatic differentiations
76.76.C47....Certification of software
76.76.C54....Children's software
76.76.C64....Compatibility of software
76.76.C65....Compilers
76.76.C66....Component software
76.76.C672...Computer games
76.76.C68....Computer viruses
76.76.C69....Configuration management
76.76.C73....Costs
76.76.D47....Development
76.76.D49....Device drivers
76.76.D57....Disassemblers Including decompilers
76.76.D63....Documentation of software
76.76.E93....Evaluation of software
76.76.E95....Expert systems
76.76.F34....Failures of software
76.9.F48.....File conversion software
76.76.F75....Free computer software
76.76.G46....Generators
76.76.H85....Human factors
76.76.H94....Hypertext systems Including hypertext document markup languages, e. g. HTML (Document markup language), etc.
76.76.I55....Install programs
76.76.I57....Integrated software
76.76.I58....Intelligent agents
76.76.I59....Interactive media. Hypermedia
76.76.S65....Measurement, Software
76.76.M52....Microsoft .NET
76.76.M54....Middleware Including object monitors
76.76.O63....Operating systems Including DOS, UNIX, OS/2, etc.
76.76.P37....Patterns, Software
76.76.P74....Productivity
76.76.P76....Protection of software
76.76.Q35....Quality control
76.76.R42....Refactoring of software
76.76.R44....Reliability
76.76.R47....Reusability
76.76.S27.....SAP NetWeaver Gateway
76.76.S37....Screen savers
76.76.S375...Self-adaptive software
76.76.S46....Shareware
76.76.F34....Software failures
76.76.S63....Software frameworks
76.76.S64....Software maintenance
76.76.S65....Software measurement
76.76.S66....Software support
76.76.S69....Spyware
76.76.S73....Standards for software
76.76.S95....Systems software
76.76.T45....Teleprocessing monitors
76.76.T47....Termination
76.76.T48....Testing of software
76.76.T49....Text editors
76.76.T55....Threads
76.76.T83....Translators
76.76.U84....Utilities
76.76.V47....Verification and validation of software
76.76.C68....Viruses
76.76.W56....Windows
76.76.S64....Year 2000 date conversion 
76.765........Firm-ware
76.77.........Operating Systems
76.76.T48.........General works
76.774.A-Z........Individual operating systems. By system, A-Z
76.774.A53........Android
76.774.B47........Berkeley BSD
76.774.D67........DOS
76.774.F74........FreeBSD
76.774.I67........iOS
76.774.L46........Linux
76.774.M33........Mac OS
76.774.M43........Microsoft Windows 7
76.774.M434.......Microsoft Windows 8
76.774.M435.......Microsoft Windows 10
76.774.M48........Microsoft Windows Me
76.774.M53........Microsoft Windows NT
76.774.M55........Microsoft Windows server
76.774.M56........Microsoft Windows Vista
76.774.M58........Microsoft Windows XP
76.774.S65........Solaris
76.774.U28........Ubuntu
76.774.U64........UNIX
76.8.A-Z......Special computers, computer systems, and microprocessors. By name, A-Z
76.8.A54......AN/FSQ-7

101-145...........Elementary mathematics. Arithmetic
150-272.5.........Algebra
273-280...........Probabilities. Mathematical statistics
299.6-433.........Analysis
440-699...........Geometry. Trigonometry. Topology
801-939...........Analytic mechanics

QB - Astronomy 

1-991..........Astronomy
1-139.........General
140-237.......Practical and spherical astronomy
275-343.......Geodesy
349-421.......Theoretical astronomy and celestial mechanics
455-456.......Astrogeology
460-466.......Astrophysics
468-480.......Non-optical methods of astronomy
495-903.......Descriptive astronomy
500.5-785....Solar System
799-903......Stars
980-991.......Cosmology

QC - Physics 

1-999..............Physics
1-75..............General
81-114............Weights and measures
120-168.85........Descriptive and experimental mechanics
170-197...........Atomic physics. Constitution and properties of matter including molecular physics, relativity, quantum theory and solid state physics
221-246...........Acoustics. Sound
251-338.5.........Heat
310.15-319.......Thermodynamics
350-467...........Optics. Light
450-467..........Spectroscopy
474-496.9.........Radiation physics (General)
501-766...........Electricity and magnetism
501-721..........Electricity
669-675.8.......Electromagnetic theory
676-678.6.......Radio waves (Theory)
680.............Quantum Electrodynamics
701-715.4.......Electric discharge
717.6-718.8.....Plasma physics. Ionized gases
750-766..........Magnetism
770-798...........Nuclear and particle physics. Atomic energy. Radioactivity
793-793.5........Elementary particle physics
794.95-798.......Radioactivity and radioactive substances
801-809...........Geophysics. Cosmic physics
811-849...........Geomagnetism
851-999...........Meteorology. Climatology (including the earth's atmosphere)
974.5-976........Meteorological optics
980-999..........Climatology and weather
994.95-999......Weather forecasting

QD - Chemistry 

1-999..............Chemistry
1-65..............General (including alchemy)
71-142............Analytical chemistry
146-197...........Inorganic chemistry
241-441...........Organic chemistry
415-436..........Biochemistry
450-801...........Physical and theoretical chemistry
625-655..........Radiation chemistry
701-731..........Photochemistry
901-999...........Crystallography

QE - Geology 

1-996.5............Geology
1-350.62..........General (including geographical divisions)
351-399.2.........Mineralogy
420-499...........Petrology
500-639.5.........Dynamic and structural geology
521-545..........Volcanoes and earthquakes
601-613.5........Structural geology
640-699...........Stratigraphy
701-760...........Paleontology
760.8-899.2.......Paleozoology
901-996.5.........Paleobotany

QH - Natural history - Biology 

1-278.5............Natural History (General)
1-199.5...........General (including nature conservation, geographical distribution)
201-278.5.........Microscopy
301-705.5..........Biology (General)
359-425...........Evolution
426-470...........Genetics
471-489...........Reproduction
501-531...........Life
540-549.5.........Ecology
573-671...........Cytology
705-705.5.........Economic biology

QK - Botany 

1-989..............Botany
1-474.5...........General (including geographical distribution)
474.8-495.........Spermatophyta. Phanerogams
494-494.5........Gymnosperms
495..............Angiosperms
504-638...........Cryptogams
640-707...........Plant anatomy
710-899...........Plant physiology
900-989...........Plant ecology

QL - Zoology 

1-991..............Zoology
1-355.............General (including geographical distribution)
360-599.82........Invertebrates
461-599.82.......Insects
605-739.8.........Chordates. Vertebrates
614-639.8........Fishes
640-669.3........Reptiles and amphibians
671-699..........Birds
700-739.8........Mammals
750-795...........Animal behavior
791-795..........Stories and anecdotes
799-799.5.........Morphology
801-950.9.........Anatomy
951-991...........Embryology

QM - Human anatomy 

1-695..............Human anatomy
1-511.............General
531-549...........Regional anatomy
550-577.8.........Human and comparative histology
601-695...........Human embryology

QP - Physiology 

1-981..............Physiology
1-345.............General (including influence of the environment)
351-495...........Neurophysiology and neuropsychology
501-801...........Animal biochemistry
901-981...........Experimental pharmacology

QR - Microbiology 

1-502..............Microbiology
1-74.5............General
75-99.5...........Bacteria
99.6-99.8.........Cyanobacteria
100-130...........Microbial ecology
171...............Microorganisms in the animal body
180-198.5.........Immunology
355-502...........Virology

References

Further reading 
 Full schedule of all LCC Classifications
 List of all LCC Classification Outlines

Q